Truant may refer to:

 HMS Truant (N68), a T-class submarine
 Truant (steamboat), which operated in Oregon, United States, in the 1910s
 truANT, Alien Ant Farm's second album

See also
 Truancy